800 Naval Air Squadron was a Royal Navy Fleet Air Arm carrier-based squadron formed on 3 April 1933 by amalgamating No's 402 and 404 (Fleet Fighter) Flights.

History

1930s
The squadron was first equipped with nine single-seat Hawker Nimrod fighter aircraft and three two-seat Hawker Ospreys to act as navigation leaders for the Nimrods. It served aboard HMS Courageous in the Home Fleet. In 1935–1936, the carrier and squadron operated in the Mediterranean. The squadron re-equipped with the Blackburn Skua in November 1938 and took these aboard HMS Ark Royal. The Skua was a dive bomber with a secondary fighter role to allow the destruction or driving-off of enemy reconnaissance aircraft.

In 1939, 800 Squadron was flying primarily Blackburn B-24 Skuas and a few Blackburn Rocs from Ark Royal. The Squadron was transferred to Admiralty control on 24 May 1939.

Second World War
During the German invasion of Norway in 1940, whilst based at Royal Navy Air Station Hatston, Kirkwall, Orkney 800 and 803 Squadrons dive-bombed the German cruiser Königsberg at Bergen on 10 April 1940, 800 Squadron providing five Skuas to the force that sank the Königsberg. The squadron embarked on Ark Royal later that month, with the carrier providing air cover to the fleet and to Allied troops. 800 Squadron's Skua's claimed six Heinkel He 111 bombers shot down and a further as probably destroyed. On 13 June 1940, Ark Royal launched a dive bomber attack against the German Battleship Scharnhorst, under repair at Trondheim, with 800 Squadron losing four Skuas out of six, with the Squadron's Commanding Officer, Captain R.T. Partridge, RM was taken POW, while 803 Squadron lost four Skuas from nine. In July 1940, the squadron was involved in the attack on the French Fleet at Oran. Two SM.79 bombers were shot down off Sardinia.

On regrouping later that year, the squadron joined  for an attack on Petsamo, and after the West Indies onboard  was involved in the Madagascar operations.

Hawker Sea Hurricanes were received in 1942 and took part in the North African landings off  in November 1942. In July 1943, the Squadron was the first FAA squadron to be equipped with the Grumman Hellcat. The squadron, operating from  provided escort for Fairey Barracudas in the April 1944 attacks from against the Tirpitz in Alta Fjord, Norway.

1950s

During the Korean War, the Squadron and its Seafire F.47s were on board HMS Triumph and their first operation was a strike by 12 Seafires and 9 Fairey Fireflies on Haeju airfield on 3 July 1950. Because of their short range, the Seafires were frequently given the Combat Air Patrol task over the fleet. During the Inchon landings in September 1950 Seafires flew armed reconnaissance missions and spotted for the bombarding cruisers. But, by the end of the month, No 800 had only three serviceable aircraft and no replacements were available in the Far East. The inevitable crop of landing accidents and cumulative airframe stress damage meant the end of the Seafire's operational life.

In August 1951 the Supermarine Attacker entered service with the Squadron at Ford, West Sussex, later embarking in HMS Eagle. It was the first jet fighter to be standardised in the Fleet Air Arms first-line squadrons, and by 1953 the sqn had upgraded to the FB.2 version of the Attacker, but the following year the Attacker was withdrawn from frontline service and passed to training and reserve units. 800 NAS then recommissioned with Armstrong Whitworth Sea Hawk FB.3s in July 1954, and joined the newly commissioned  the following year. As with other FAA Sea Hawk units at the time, the sqn operated later marks of Sea Hawk as they became available culminating in the FGA.6. During the 1950s, 800's aircraft usually had the tails painted red, and this evolved into a forward pointing red arrowhead design with crossed swords over a trident in yellow in the centre.

1960s
800 NAS reformed as a Supermarine Scimitar F.1 unit in July 1959 with six aircraft, under the command of Lt. Cmdr. D. P. Norman AFC at RNAS Lossiemouth, later re joining 's air group in March 1960. After operating worldwide from the Ark, 800 returned to 'Lossie' in December 1963 and disbanded in February 1964, its aircraft being passed to 803NAS to bring that unit up to 16 aircraft. A month later 800 NAS recommissioned as a Blackburn Buccaneer S.1 squadron, equipped with 10 Buccaneers and four Scimitar F1s for service on the newly refitted . The latter aircraft were for the next two years operated by 800B Flight, their aircraft adorned with a 'foaming tankard' badge on their tails as they were to be used as in-flight refuelling tankers as the underpowered Buccaneer S.1 could not be launched from a carrier with a full weapons load and full fuel tanks. The Buccaneers were launched fully armed but with a light fuel load, and would then 'top up' from waiting Scimitars which had been launched previously. 800 NAS was the only FAA squadron organised this way, and it was an interim measure pending the arrival of the Mk 2 Buccaneer. In June 1966 the Mk 2s began to replace the Mk 1s and the Scimitars, completing the process by November of that year.

In March 1967 the oil tanker Torrey Canyon ran aground on Seven Stones Reef near Lands End and started to leak thousands of tons of crude oil into the sea, putting nearby beaches at risk of pollution. In an attempt to minimise the damage to the environment, the Buccaneers of 800 NAS along with those of the training squadron 736 NAS were ordered to destroy the tanker and its cargo. Flying from RNAS Brawdy in Wales on 28 March 1967, eight Buccaneers dropped 42000 lbs of high explosive bombs and achieved a 75% success rate. The aim was to rip open the hull of the tanker to release its cargo then set fire to it on the open sea, destroying the oil before it reached the beaches. After this the squadron rejoined Eagle for the remainder of her career.

During this period the squadron operated 14 Buccaneer S.2s, and as with its sister squadron 809 Naval Air Squadron aboard Ark Royal in the 1970s, the squadron normally kept ten strike aircraft ready, two more fitted with a specially designed reconnaissance pallet in the rotating bomb bay, and the final two aircraft were fitted with buddy refuelling pods as tanker aircraft. After covering the British withdrawal from 'East of Suez' Eagle returned home to pay off in January 1972, her squadrons flown back to their shore bases to disband. 800 Squadron returned to Lossiemouth and disbanded on 23 February 1972, and its aircraft were passed to the RAF.

1980s

Falklands War
On the outbreak of the Falklands War 800 NAS, now under the command of Lieutenant Commander Andy Auld, was brought up to its wartime strength of twelve Sea Harrier FRS1s by transferring four aircraft and their crews from the training squadron 899 NAS, with a further three Sea Harriers taken from storage or trials use. The squadron embarked in Hermes whilst she was still alongside in Portsmouth Dockyard. The other Sea Harrier squadron 801 NAS, aboard Invincible similarly received four aircraft. Two of the squadron's planes were lost, one when it exploded on takeoff from Hermes and one shot down during an attack on Goose Green. No Harriers were lost in air-to-air fighting and the squadron destroyed 13 enemy aircraft. Lieutenant Commander Gordon Batt DSC was killed in action flying a Sea Harrier FRS 1 from Hermes on 23 May 1982. During the conflict another Sea Harrier squadron, 809 NAS was formed with eight spare aircraft and sent south aboard the MV Atlantic Conveyor, and on arrival in the South Atlantic these aircraft were divided between the two carriers, four each to 800 NAS and 801 NAS. The aircraft were absorbed into these squadrons, as the 899 aircraft had been, but remained recognisable as they had been painted in light grey low visibility camouflage as opposed to the dark sea grey scheme used by all the other Sea Harriers.

Post-Falklands

Post war, 809 NAS reacquired its aircraft and crews and returned to the UK alongside 800 NAS aboard Hermes, only to embark aboard the newly completed  and return to the Falklands so that Invincible could be relieved to return home. 809 NAS disbanded in December 1982 on return to the UK. Illustrious had been sent into the South Atlantic before being commissioned properly and spent the next few months catching up on preparations for full commissioning, after which 800 NAS was transferred to Illustrious in September 1983. Squadron strength was increased first to six Sea Harriers then gradually up to eight aircraft as a result of lessons relearned during the conflict. In the mid-1990s the squadron re-equipped with the more capable Sea Harrier FA.2.

In January 1998, in addition to 800 NAS's Sea Harriers FA.2s, RAF Harriers GR.7s operated from Invincible in the Persian Gulf, typically in a mix of seven FA.2s and seven GR.7s.

2000s

In April 2004, while based in Yeovilton the squadron was disbanded following the decision to withdraw the FA.2s early as a cost-saving measure. It was re-commissioned on 31 March 2006 under Commander Adrian Orchard, when 800 NAS became the first RN squadron within Joint Force Harrier as part of Number 1 Group within RAF Strike Command. In March 2007, the squadron combined with 801 NAS to form the Naval Strike Wing. On 1 April 2010, NSW reverted to the identity of 800 Naval Air Squadron.
The squadron disbanded later that year, as a result of the 2010 Strategic Defence and Security Review and the subsequent withdrawal of Harrier fleet. The last Commanding Officer was Commander David Lindsay. In 2012 Kettering Sea Cadets were named 800 NAS to keep the squadron alive. Lt M Pether RNR Head of Flight within the Sea Cadet Corps, maintains the traditions of the Naval Air Squadron and will continue to do so until 800 NAS gets re-commissioned .

Aircraft flown
The 800 squadron has flown 15 different aircraft types, including:

Pre-WW2  (Biplanes):
 Hawker Nimrod (1933–1939)
 Hawker Osprey (1933–1939)
 Gloster Gladiator (1938–1939)

WW2  (Monoplanes):

 Blackburn Skua (1938–1941)
 Blackburn Roc (1939)
 Fairey Fulmar (1941–1942)
 Hawker Sea Hurricane (1942–1943)
 Grumman Hellcat (1943–1945)
 Supermarine Seafire (1946–1950)

Post WW2 (Jets):

 Supermarine Attacker (1951–1954)
 Hawker Sea Hawk (1955–1956)
 Supermarine Scimitar (1959–1964)
 Blackburn Buccaneer (1964–1972)
 BAE Sea Harrier (1980–2004)
 BAe Harrier (2006–2010)

Battle honours 
800 Naval Air Squadron has received the following battle honours.

 Norway 1940–4
 Mediterranean 1940–1
 Spartivento 1940
 Malta Convoys 1941–2
 Norway 1940–4
 Bismarck' 1941
 Diego Suarez 1942
 North Africa 1942
 South France 1944
 Aegean 1944
 Burma 1945
 Malaya 1949
 Falkland Islands 1982

See also
Andy Auld (Royal Navy officer). Sea Harrier pioneer

References

Notes

Bibliography

External links

 
 

Military units and formations established in 1933
Military units and formations disestablished in 2010
800 Squadron
Military units and formations of the United Kingdom in the Falklands War
Military units and formations of the United Kingdom in the Korean War